Kizhakku Kadalkarai Salai is a 2006 Tamil action romance film
directed by S. S. Stanley. Srikanth and Bhavana played the lead roles. The film received poor reviews from critics.

Plot
The movie begins with an orphan Ganesh coming in search of a job at a petrol bunk in ECR. He manages to win the goodwill of the petrol bunk owner and gets a job there. Enters Priya, an arrogant college student. He throws a challenge to his friends to make Priya fall for him. Meanwhile, Priya's brother GTR, a leading criminal lawyer in the city, learns of Ganesh's moves and tries to thwart his plans.

Ganesh had lost his family to the tsunami on 26 December 2004, when they were at ECR to attend a family function. Coming to know of his past and his good ways, Priya is attracted to Ganesh. Priya's brother hatches a conspiracy to prevent them from getting married. He kidnaps his sister, and the blame falls on Ganesh.

How Ganesh overcomes all tragic events and succeeds in holding Priya's hands is the remaining part of the story.

Cast
 Srikanth as Ganesh
 Bhavana as Priya
 Suresh as Advocate GTR
 Ganja Karuppu as Petrol Pump Employee
 Muthukaalai as Petrol Pump Employee
 Santhana Bharathi as Politician
 Vijay Antony as Himself
 Sridevi Ashok as Devi, Priya's friend

Production 
"Valaipechu" Anthanan is the producer of  this film. 
Meera Jasmine was considered to play the heroine.

Soundtrack
Soundtrack was composed by Paul J.
 "Kancha Penna" - Veeramani, Pallavi	
 "Kengini Mingini" - Suresh Peter, Grace Karunas	
 "Oru Koodi" - Donan Narray, Ganga	
 "Vada Vangada" - Jassie Gift, Veeramani	
 "Ajarey Ajarey" - Boney Chakravarthy	
 "Eno Edhil Eno" - Jaydev	
 "Welcome To Ecr" - Swapna

Reception
Now running wrote, "Even though the Director has tried hard to work a presentable potion, the end result is not so lip-smacking for the audience. The screenplay and narration lacks spice, verve and conviction". Rediff wrote "A virtually invisible script by writer-director SS Stanley and meaningless songs, Stanley cannot seem to get it right in the horror that is Kizhakku Kadakarkarai Salai". Thiraipadam wrote "Kizhakku Kadarkarai Saalai has a likable lead pair, an interesting setting for their romance and a heartless villain to set up roadblocks. But weak and confusing characterization overrides all that to result in a tepid romance".

References

External links
 

2006 films
Indian romantic action films
2000s Tamil-language films
2000s romantic action films
Films directed by S. S. Stanley